These are the results for the 33rd edition of the Ronde van Nederland cycling race, which was held from August 16 to August 20, 1993. The race started in Leiden (South Holland) and finished in Valkenburg (Limburg).

Stages

16-08-1993: Leiden-Tilburg, 155 km

17-08-1993: Tilburg-Huizen, 193 km

18-08-1993: Huizen-Hardenberg, 109 km

18-08-1993: Hardenberg-Hardenberg (Time Trial), 23 km

19-08-1993: Deventer-Venlo, 181 km

20-08-1993: Venlo-Valkenburg, 195 km

Final classification

External links
Wielersite Results

Ronde van Nederland
August 1993 sports events in Europe
1993 in road cycling
1993 in Dutch sport